Habeas corpus is a legal action through which a person can seek relief from unlawful detention.

Habeas corpus may also refer to:
Habeas Corpus Act 1679, an Act of the Parliament of England passed during the reign of King Charles II to define and strengthen the writ of habeas corpus
Habeas Corpus (1928 film), a Laurel and Hardy short
Habeas Corpus, the name of the fictional film that is being made in the film The Player
"Habeas Corpus", an episode of the television series Ultraviolet
"Habeas Corpses", a 2003 episode of the television series Angel
Habeas Corpus (play), a 1973 comedy stage play by Alan Bennett
Habeas Corpus (pig), a fictional pet in the pulp magazine Doc Savage
Habeas Corpus (album), an album by Living Things
Habeas corpus (gastropod), see List of non-marine molluscs of Brazil